The 1982 Montana Grizzlies football team represented the University of Montana in the 1982 NCAA Division I-AA football season as a member of the Big Sky Conference. The Grizzlies were led by third-year head coach Larry Donovan, played their home games at Dornblaser Field and finished the season with a record of six wins and six losses (6–6, 5–2 Big Sky) as the Big Sky Conference champions. Tied with Idaho and Montana State at the top of the league standings, Montana defeated both to win the tie-breaker and title.

Schedule

References

External links
Montana Grizzlies football – 1982 media guide

Montana
Montana Grizzlies football seasons
Big Sky Conference football champion seasons
Montana Grizzlies football